The Mesa Citrus Growers Association is a citrus growers association located in Mesa, Arizona. It was founded in the 1920s to take advantage of the growing citrus industry in the region. During this time, it partnered with Sunkist Growers, Incorporated, in a building that operated until 2010.

References

External links
 Images of the building

Food manufacturers of the United States
Agricultural cooperatives in the United States
Agricultural marketing cooperatives
Companies based in Mesa, Arizona
Agriculture in Arizona
1920s establishments in Arizona